Scythian descent claims refers to claims of descent from the Scythians, an Iranian people best known for dominating the Pontic steppe from about 700 BC to 400 BC. Claims of descent from the Scythians have been frequent throughout history.

Claims 
Some legends of the Poles, the Picts, the Gaels, the Hungarians, among others, also include mention of Scythian origins. Some writers claim that Scythians figured in the formation of the empire of the Medes and likewise of Caucasian Albania.

The Scythians also feature in some national origin-legends of the Celts. In the second paragraph of the 1320 Declaration of Arbroath, the élite of Scotland claim Scythia as a former homeland of the Scots. According to the 11th-century Lebor Gabála Érenn (The Book of the Taking of Ireland), the 14th-century Auraicept na n-Éces and other Irish folklore, the Irish originated in Scythia and were descendants of Fénius Farsaid, a Scythian prince who created the Ogham alphabet.

The Carolingian kings of the Franks traced Merovingian ancestry to the Germanic tribe of the Sicambri. Gregory of Tours documents in his History of the Franks that when Clovis was baptised, he was referred to as a Sicamber with the words "Mitis depone colla, Sicamber, adora quod incendisti, incendi quod adorasti." The Chronicle of Fredegar in turn reveals that the Franks believed the Sicambri to be a tribe of Scythian or Cimmerian descent, who had changed their name to Franks in honour of their chieftain Franco in 11 BC.

In the 17th and 18th centuries, foreigners regarded the Russians as descendants of Scythians. It became conventional to refer to Russians as Scythians in 18th-century poetry, and Alexander Blok drew on this tradition sarcastically in his last major poem,  (1920). In the 19th century, romantic revisionists in the West transformed the "barbarian" Scyths of literature into the wild and free, hardy and democratic ancestors of all blond Indo-Europeans.

Based on such accounts of Scythian founders of certain Germanic as well as Celtic tribes, British historiography in the British Empire period such as Sharon Turner in his History of the Anglo-Saxons, made them the ancestors of the Anglo-Saxons.

The idea was taken up in the British Israelism of John Wilson, who adopted and promoted the idea that the "European Race, in particular the Anglo-Saxons, were descended from certain Scythian tribes, and these Scythian tribes (as many had previously stated from the Middle Ages onward) were in turn descended from the Ten Lost Tribes of Israel." Tudor Parfitt, author of The Lost Tribes of Israel and Professor of Modern Jewish Studies, points out that the proof cited by adherents of British Israelism is "of a feeble composition even by the low standards of the genre."

Characteristically, early modern English discourse on Ireland, such as that of William Camden and Edmund Spenser, frequently resorted to comparisons with Scythians in order to confirm that the indigenous population of Ireland descended from these ancient "bogeymen," and showed themselves as barbaric as their alleged ancestors.

Legends about the origin of the population from the Scythian ancestor Targitaos – son of Borysthenes's daughter (that was the name of the Dnipro river in antiquity) – are popular in Ukraine. In Ukraine, which territory Herodotus of Halicarnassus described in his work on the Scythians, there are discussions about how serious the influence of the Scythians was on the ethnogenesis of Ukrainians. Currently, there are studies that indicate the relationship of Slavic tribes living in Ukraine with the Scythian plowmen (plough man) and farmers who belonged to the Proto-Slavic Chernoles or Black Forest culture. The description of Scythia by Herodotus is also called the oldest description of Ukraine. Despite the absolute dissimilarity of modern Ukrainian and hypothetical Scythian languages, researchers claim it still left some marks, such as the fricative pronunciation of the letter "г," the specific alternation, etc.

See also
 Sarmatism

Notes and sources

Notes

Sources

 
 
 
 
 

Origin hypotheses of ethnic groups
Descent claims